The North West Cape delma (Delma tealei), also known commonly as Teale's delma, is a species of lizard in the family
Pygopodidae. The species is endemic to Western Australia.

Etymology
The specific name, tealei, is in honor of Australian zoologist Roy Teale.

Geographic range
D. tealei is found on the North West Cape peninsula in northwestern Western Australia.

Habitat
The preferred natural habitats of D. tealei are grassland and rocky areas.

Description
Legless and snake-like, D. tealei may attain a snout-to-vent length (SVL) of almost .

Reproduction
D. tealei is oviparous.

References

Further reading
Cogger HG (2014). Reptiles and Amphibians of Australia, Seventh Edition. Clayton, Victoria, Australia: CSIRO Publishing. xxx + 1,033 pp. .
Maryan, Brad; Aplin, Ken P.; Adams, Mark (2007). "Two new species of the Delma tincta group (Squamata: Pygopodidae) from northwestern Australia". Records of the Western Australian Museum 23: 273–305. (Delma tealei, new species, pp. 284–288, Figures 6–7).
Wilson, Steve; Swan, Gerry (2013). A Complete Guide to Reptiles of Australia, Fourth Edition. Sydney: New Holland Publishers. 522 pp. .

Pygopodids of Australia
Delma
Reptiles described in 2007
Endemic fauna of Australia